The Viceroy of Liangguang or Viceroy of the Two Guangs, was one of eight regional Viceroys during the Ming and Qing dynasties. The two Guang referred to Guangdong and Guangxi provinces. The areas under the Viceroy's jurisdiction included present-day Guangdong and Guangxi provinces, as well as Hainan Province.

Name 
Its full name in Chinese is Governor-General, Commander and Quartermaster, Supervisor of Waterways, and Inspector-General of the Two Expanses and Surrounding Areas.

History

Ming dynasty
The office of the Viceroy of Liangguang originated in 1452 during the Ming dynasty. The Jingtai Emperor accepted Yu Qian's proposal to create the office and appointed Wang Ao (王翱) as the first viceroy.

In 1465, the Chenghua Emperor appointed Han Yong (韓雍) as Left Censor-in-Chief and Viceroy of Liangguang. The office was formalised in 1469, with the administrative headquarters fixed in Wuzhou, Guangxi.

In 1536, during the reign of the Jiajing Emperor, the viceroy Qian Rujing (錢如京) created a separate administrative branch in Zhaoqing, Guangdong. In 1564, the headquarters shifted from Wuzhou to Zhaoqing after Wu Guifang (吳桂芳) sought approval from the Jiajing Emperor.

Qing dynasty
The office was recreated in 1644 during the reign of the Shunzhi Emperor in the Qing dynasty. It was called "Viceroy of Guangdong" (廣東總督) even though its jurisdiction included Guangxi. The headquarters were in Guangzhou, Guangdong. In 1655, the headquarters shifted back to Wuzhou.

In 1663, during the reign of the Kangxi Emperor, the office was split into two: Viceroy of Guangdong and Viceroy of Guangxi. The headquarters of the Viceroy of Guangdong moved to Lianzhou (廉州; present-day Hepu County, Guangxi). A year later, the Viceroy of Guangxi was merged with the Viceroy of Guangdong, and the headquarters shifted back to Zhaoqing.

In 1723, during the reign of the Yongzheng Emperor, the office was divided into Guangdong and Guangxi again, but were merged again within the following year. In 1729, in response to a rebellion by the Miao people, the Yongzheng Emperor placed Guangxi under the jurisdiction of the Viceroy of Yun-Gui to facilitate the coordination of military operations. In 1734, Guangdong and Guangxi were merged under a single office, Viceroy of Liangjiang, and had remained like this until 1905.

In 1746, during the reign of the Qianlong Emperor, the headquarters of the Viceroy of Liangguang shifted to Guangzhou and remained there permanently.

In 1905, during the reign of the Guangxu Emperor, the Viceroy of Liangguang concurrently held the position of Provincial Governor of Guangdong.

List of Viceroys of Liangguang

Ming dynasty

Southern Ming dynasty

Qing dynasty

References

Citations

Sources 

 

History of Guangdong
History of Guangxi